Hercules fighting Nemean lion is a 1634 work by Francisco de Zurbarán. It is conserved in the Museo del Prado.

Description 
The painting depicts Heracles fighting the Nemean Lion. The Spanish art critic Soria suggests a comparison with a woodcut fashioned by Cornelis Cort after a work by Frans Floris, based on the hero's position. The rocky setting was designed according to a woodcut by Barthel Beham: Fighting versus centaur (1542).

It is one of series of 10 artworks on the Labours of Hercules commissioned by Philip IV of Spain for the decoration of the Hall of Realms in the Buen Retiro Palace. The series is now on show at the Museo del Prado.

Bibliography 
 Juan Antonio Gaya Nuño et Tiziana Frati, La obra Pictórica de Zurbarán, éditions Planeta, Barcelone, 1988,  p. 131-132.

Lions in art
Paintings depicting Heracles
Paintings by Francisco de Zurbarán
1630s paintings